The 1967–68 Weber State Wildcats men's basketball team represented Weber State College during the 1967–68 NCAA University Division basketball season. Members of the Big Sky Conference, the Wildcats were led by eighth-year head coach Dick Motta and played their home games on campus at Wildcat Gym in Ogden, Utah.

Weber State won the Big Sky title and gained the conference's first-ever berth in the 23-team NCAA tournament. In the West regional at nearby Salt Lake City, the Wildcats fell by eleven points to New Mexico State.

Motta left in late May to become head coach of the NBA's Chicago Bulls, and assistant Phil Johnson was promoted to head coach of the Wildcats.

Postseason result

|-
!colspan=9 style=| NCAA Tournament

References

External links
Sports Reference – Weber State Wildcats: 1967–68 basketball season
2015–16 Media Guide: 1967–68 season

Weber State Wildcats men's basketball seasons
Weber State